The CAMS 120 was an observation amphibian built by CAMS in the 1930s. It was a high-wing monoplane of all-metal construction.

Specifications

References

Flying boats
1930s French military reconnaissance aircraft
120
Aircraft first flown in 1935